Eranina piriana is a species of beetle in the family Cerambycidae. It was described by Martins and Galileo in 1993. It is known from Colombia and Venezuela.

References

Eranina
Beetles described in 1993